, is a 2009 hack and slash video game developed by Koei and Omega Force for the PlayStation 3 and Microsoft Windows. Z is the third installment of the Warriors Orochi series, a crossover video game of the Dynasty Warriors and Samurai Warriors series. Musou Orochi Z was intended to be a combination of the first two games with more characters and stages on an updated gaming platform. The game was released in Japan for the PS3 on March 12, 2009, and released for the Windows on November 27, 2009. Koei had planned to release the game as Warriors Orochi Z in North America and Europe, but those plans have since been cancelled.

Gameplay
As Musou Orochi Z is a combination of the first two games, the gameplay follows the standard set by the first Orochi; the player selects three characters and uses them in one stage. However, certain aspects of the gameplay have been changed. For the first time, the second player can choose their own separate team of three characters, unlike the previous two games where both players are forced to use the same characters.

Dream Mode too has been changed; 12 stages have been added, giving a total of 40 Dream mode stages. Unlike Warriors Orochi 2, characters outside the Three Kingdoms and Sengoku periods are included as well. These are also included in the Western release of Warriors Orochi 2 on the PSP, as this game is not being released in Europe or North America.

Characters

In addition to the 92 characters from the first two Orochi games returning, two newcomers are to make their first appearance in the game as well:

Benkei (弁慶) was a warrior monk of the Heian period, most famously known for his loyalty to Minamoto no Yoshitsune, and his collection of weapons. He wields a giant glove as his weapon and is under the "PWR" category
San Zang (三藏法師, Sanzō Hōshi) is the central character of the classic Chinese epic Journey to the West, where Sun Wukong also originated from. However, in a break of traditional portrayals, Sanzang in Warriors Orochi Z is portrayed as a female. Her weapons are her sleeves, based on Chinese traditional Ribbon Dancing, and is under the "SPD" category.

Additionally, Dodomekki and Gyuki, two Orochi army generals that were only playable in the VS and Survival mode of Warriors Orochi 2, have been made into fully fledged characters that can be used throughout the entire game, complete with updated and improved movesets.

With the addition of four characters, a total of 96 characters encompass the roster of Warriors Orochi Z.

The game also adds an unlockable fourth costume in addition to the already available three. These costumes can be unlocked by reaching Proficiency level 20. The Dynasty Warriors characters mainly get their Dynasty Warriors 6 costumes, while the Samurai Warriors characters are getting their alternate costume from Samurai Warriors or Samurai Warriors 2: Xtreme Legends. Characters who were cut from these titles or exclusive for the Warriors Orochi series have new costumes entirely.

References

External links
Official website
KOEI Warriors - Musou Orochi Z
Warriors Orochi Z announcement

2009 video games
Crossover video games
Crowd-combat fighting games
Japan-exclusive video games
Koei games
Multiplayer and single-player video games
Omega Force games
PlayStation 3 games
Video games about samurai
Video games based on Chinese mythology
Video games based on Japanese mythology
Video games developed in Japan
Z
Windows games